Rodionovskaya is a rural locality (a village) in Rochegodskoye Rural Settlement of Vinogradovsky District, Arkhangelsk Oblast, Russia. The population was 117 as of 2010. There is 1 street.

Geography 
Rodionovskaya is located on the Severnaya Dvina River, 41 km northwest of Bereznik (the district's administrative centre) by road. Morzhegory is the nearest rural locality.

References 

Rural localities in Vinogradovsky District